Clearwater Lake Provincial Park was designated a provincial park by the Government of Manitoba in 1963. The park is considered to be a Class II protected area under the IUCN protected area management categories.

See also
List of protected areas of Manitoba

External links
iNaturalist: Clearwater Lake Provincial Park
eBird: Clearwater Lake Provincial Park

References

Provincial parks of Manitoba
Protected areas of Manitoba